Caverswall is a civil parish in the district of Staffordshire Moorlands, Staffordshire, England. It contains 19 listed buildings that are recorded in the National Heritage List for England. Of these, one is listed at Grade I, the highest of the three grades, one is at Grade II*, the middle grade, and the others are at Grade II, the lowest grade.  The parish contains the village of Caverswall and the surrounding area.  In the parish is Caverswall Castle, a country house on the site of an earlier castle; this is listed together with associated structures.  St Peter's Church, dating from the 12th century, is listed, together with items in the churchyard.  The other listed buildings consist of houses and farmhouses, another church, a former public house, and a milepost.


Key

Buildings

References

Citations

Sources

Lists of listed buildings in Staffordshire